Manikka Wadu Richard de Silva (18 November 1900 - ?) was a Ceylonese 
lawyer and politician.

Manikka Wadu Richard de Silva was born on 18 November 1900 in Ambalangoda, Ceylon. He served as the president of Youth Buddhist Association of Gampola, and in 1942 was a founding member of the Law Society of Ceylon.

De Silva ran as the United National Party candidate in the seat of Gampola at the 2nd parliamentary election, held between 24 May 1952 and 30 May 1952. He successfully defeated both the Sri Lanka Freedom Party candidate, P. M. Jayasena, and the sitting member, R. S. Pelpola, polling 7,950 votes (43% of the total vote) against their 5,313 votes and 2,352 votes respectively. He was subsequently elected Deputy Chairman of Committees, a position he retained until February 1956.

He contested the 3rd parliamentary election, held between 5 April 1956 and 10 April 1956, but failed to retain his seat, losing to Pelpola, who ran as the Sri Lanka Freedom Party candidate, 4,302 votes to 13,143 votes.

References

1900 births
Date of death missing
Members of the 2nd Parliament of Ceylon
Sinhalese lawyers
Sinhalese politicians
United National Party politicians